Fava is a surname. People with the surname include:

 Amand-Joseph Fava (1826–1899), French bishop
 Anna Mainardi Fava (1933–2003), Italian politician
 Antonio Fava (born 1949), Italian actor and comedian
 Antonio Hercolani Fava Simonetti (1883–1962), Italian noble and diplomat
 Athos Fava (1925–2016), Argentine politician
 Carlo Del Fava (born 1981), Italian rugby player
 Claudio Fava (born 1957), Italian politician and writer
 Dino Fava (born 1977), Italian football player
 Enrique Fava (1920–1994), Argentine actor
 Franco Fava (born 1952), Italian athlete
 Giovanni Fava (psychiatrist) (born 1952), Italian psychiatrist and academic
 Giuseppe Fava (1925–1984), Italian writer and journalist
 Kate Del Fava (born 1998), American football player
 Maximo Fava (1911–date of death unknown), Brazilian rower
 Michael Fava (born 1962), British Catholic priest and former military officer
 Pietro Ercole Fava (1669–1744), Italian nobleman
 Ronald Fava (born 1949), American politician 
 Saverio Fava (1832–1913), Italian diplomat and politician
 Scott Fava (born 1976), Australian rugby player

Surnames of Italian origin